"", K. 552, is a military-patriotic song, composed for tenor voice and piano accompaniment by Wolfgang Amadeus Mozart. The title may be translated "On going forth to the field" (i.e., of battle).

Composition and publication
Mozart entered the composition into his personal catalog of completed works on 11 August 1788, one day after he had similarly recorded the completion of his celebrated 41st Symphony. The song was a response to the war against Turkey that had been launched by the Austrian emperor (and Mozart's patron) Joseph II. As  shows, the war initially gave rise to a highly patriotic public response, though later on it proved a fiasco for Austria (negligible territorial gains, severe economic stress, and the loss of political freedom; for all of these see Austro-Turkish War (1788–1791)).

The song was one of three patriotic works written by Mozart in response to the war. Christoph Wolff writes that Mozart "paid patriotic tribute when he wrote the orchestral contradanse La bataille, K. 535, a piece of martial music on the siege of Belgrade for the entertainment of the Redoubtensaal society." (The Redoubtensäle were the Imperial ballrooms, and Mozart's job with the Emperor required him to write music to be danced there.) Wolff also mentions "the war song 'Ich möchte wohl der Kaiser sein' ('I wish I were the emperor'), K. 539, for bass and a Turkish-style military band"; it was sung by the comedian Friedrich Baumann in a patriotic concert in the Theater in der Leopoldstadt in Vienna, 7 March 1788.

"Beim Auszug in das Feld" was published in "a short-lived periodical, to which Mozart subscribed, entitled Wochenblatt für Kinder zur angenehmen und lehrreichen Beschäftigung in ihren Freystunden ('Weekly for children, providing Pleasant and Instructive Occupation in their Leisure Hours'; iv, 1788)." The journal publication also provided some annotation and commentary, highly patriotic in tone.

According to Alexander Hyatt King, only three copies of the original publication survive today. Mozart's autograph (hand-written original) is lost.

Music
The song is short (21 bars long), and the music includes many dotted rhythms, characteristic of a military march. The music combines pairs of stanzas into its Strophic form.

Lyrics
Mozart set 18 stanzas of verse by an unknown poet; each repetition of the music covers two stanzas, so the music must be sung nine times over to cover the whole poem.

Derek Beales describes the lyrics as "manifestly propagandist, directed at persuading young men of the justice of the emperor's cause".

History and critical reception
After Mozart's death, the work went missing and was restored to the awareness of scholars and musicians only early in the 20th century; further decades were needed before the work was printed in standard scholarly editions.

 suggests that a certain degree of taboo has shrouded the work, based perhaps in scholars' reluctance to imagine Mozart participating in the creation of truculent military propaganda. One early published English-language edition eliminated the lyrics entirely, substituting a poem entitled "The Maiden and the Faun". Subsequent recordings and publications have omitted certain verses in a way that "minimiz[es] the song's bellicosity". One apologist viewpoint is offered by pianist Ulrich Eisenlohr in commentary for his Naxos Records recording of the song: he suggests that while the words are bellicose, Mozart's setting is (subversively) not so:

[The song can be] regarded as a commission. It was intended as propaganda for young people to support the unpopular Turkish campaign of Emperor Joseph II in 1788. Whether Mozart himself took the commission and subject-matter entirely seriously is open to doubt, if the subtle and humorous music is anything to go by. The big pause between "... rief Joseph seinen Heeren" ("...Joseph summoned his armies") and "sie eilten flügelschnell herbei" (“they hurried quickly to him”) has the effect of an irritating delay in the alleged lightning-quick and eager drawing-up of the army, while the violent and somewhat grotesque outburst right at the start of the piano postlude can be seen as having subversive potential.

The work is widely unknown today and is seldom performed or recorded; Beales calls it "one of the most obscure of Mozart's published and completed works".

Notes and references
Notes

References

Sources
 
  The work includes a full translation of the lyrics into English as well as a facsimile of the original printed edition.

External links
, includes discography and two recordings

Compositions by Wolfgang Amadeus Mozart
1788 compositions
1788 songs
Austrian patriotic songs